

Portugal
 Angola – José Gonçalo da Gama, Governor of Angola (1779–1782)
 Macau –
 Jose Vicente da Silveira Meneses, Governor of Macau (1778–1780)
 Antonio Jose da Costa, Governor of Macau (1780–1781)

Colonial governors
Colonial governors
1780